Amir Sultan Cemetery is a historical cemetery located in Yıldırım district of Bursa. The cemetery is named after the Islamic philosopher Amir Sultan.

History 
In the 14th century, after the Amir Sultan Mosque was built in the region during the Ottoman period and Amir Sultan's funeral was buried in the region, the people of Bursa wanted to bury the deceased people here. Upon this request, the area next to the mosque was turned into a cemetery. With the construction of the mosque and the cemetery, the population in the region increased and Emirsultan district was established. Most of Bursa's famous people were buried in this cemetery.

Notable burials 

 Ali Osman Sönmez
 Kamil Tolon
 Mehmed Baha Pars
 Mümin Gençoğlu (1932–1993)
 Reşat Oyal
 Zeki Müren (1931–1996)

References

External links

 

Cemeteries in Turkey